Nehemia Levtzion (November 24, 1935 — August 15, 2003) was an Israeli scholar of African history, Near East, Islamic, and African studies, and the President of the Open University of Israel from 1987 to 1992 and the Executive Director of the Van Leer Jerusalem Institute from 1994 to 1997.

Early and personal life
Levtzion was born in the moshav of Be'er Tuvia. His parents were Pnina (née Perlow) and Aron Lubetski, who later changed their surname to Levtzion, and he had an older sister named Hanna.   He was Jewish, and had four children. His wife Tirtza was a teacher and deputy head of Jerusalem's Gymnasia Rehavia high school in Jerusalem. They lived for a time in Ghana, where he studied the spread of Islam in Africa; the family also lived in Beit Hakerem in Jerusalem. Levtzion completed a dissertation at the University of London in 1965.

Career
Levtzion was a scholar of African history, Near East, Islamic, and African studies, and especially Islam in Africa. He taught at (starting in 1965) and was Professor of History and Asian and African Studies and the Dean of the Faculty of Humanities (1978-1981) at the Hebrew University of Jerusalem, the Director of the Ben-Zvi Institute for the Study of Jewish Communities in the East (1982-1987), the President of the Open University of Israel (1987-1992), the Executive Director of the Van Leer Jerusalem Institute (1994-1997), and the Chairman of the Council for Higher Education in Israel’s Planning and Budgeting Committee (1997-2003).

The Nehemia Levtzion Center for Islamic Studies was established at the Hebrew University of  Jerusalem in 2004.

Selected publications

Further reading 

 McDougall, E. Ann, ed. (2014). Engaging with a Legacy: Nehemia Levtzion (1935-2003). Routledge. .

References 

Academic staff of the Open University of Israel
20th-century Israeli historians
20th-century Israeli educators
1935 births
2003 deaths
People from Jerusalem
Deans (academic)
Academic staff of the Hebrew University of Jerusalem
Presidents of universities in Israel
Moshavniks
People from Southern District (Israel)
Historians of Africa
Historians of Islam
Alumni of the University of London
Israeli male writers
Israeli expatriates in Ghana
Israeli expatriates in the United Kingdom